Joppen is a Dutch surname. Notable people with the surname include:

 Egon Joppen (1926–2018), German chess master
 Guus Joppen (born 1989), Dutch professional footballer

See also
 Hoppen

Dutch-language surnames